Omorgus freyi is a species of hide beetle in the subfamily Omorginae and subgenus Afromorgus.

References

freyi
Beetles described in 1954